Antipodogomphus hodgkini is a species of dragonfly of the family Gomphidae, 
known as the Pilbara dragon. 
It is endemic to the Pilbara region of Western Australia, where it inhabits rivers, streams and pools.

Antipodogomphus hodgkini is a small to medium-sized black and yellow dragonfly with a long tail.

Antipodogomphus hodgkini was discovered and named by Tony Watson and Gunter Theiscinger in Western Australia in 1969.

Gallery

See also
 List of Odonata species of Australia

References

Gomphidae
Odonata of Australia
Endemic fauna of Australia
Taxa named by J.A.L. (Tony) Watson
Insects described in 1969